Sylvan is an unincorporated community in Warren Township in Franklin County, Pennsylvania, United States. Sylvan is located on Sylvan Drive, east of Pennsylvania Route 456.

References

Unincorporated communities in Franklin County, Pennsylvania
Unincorporated communities in Pennsylvania